"Lejla" was 's entry in the Eurovision Song Contest 2006, performed in the country's native language by Hari Mata Hari. It was composed by Eurovision Song Contest 2004 runner-up Željko Joksimović from Serbia, and the lyrics were written by Fahrudin Pecikoza and Dejan Ivanović. The song was internally selected to represent Bosnia and Herzegovina after being selected by BHT 1, Bosnia and Herzegovina's broadcaster for the contest.

Eurovision Song Contest

Selection 
On 9 February 2006, the broadcaster announced that they had internally selected Hari Varešanović to represent Bosnia and Herzegovina in Athens. The song to be performed at the contest, "Lejla", was also selected internally and was presented during a television special entitled BH Eurosong 2006 on 5 March 2006. The show was broadcast on BHT 1, BHT SAT as well as streamed online via the broadcaster's website pbsbih.ba.

At Eurovision 
Here, it was performed twenty-second, following 's Sandra Oxenryd with "Through My Window" and preceding 's Silvia Night with "Congratulations". Here, it received 267 points, placing second in a field of 23 and qualifying for the final. The song later on also won the journalists' award for best composition of the Eurovision Song Contest 2006.

In the final, it was performed thirteenth, following 's Mihai Trăistariu with "Tornerò" and preceding 's LT United with "We Are the Winners". At the close of voting, it had received 229 points, placing third in a field of 24 and meaning that Bosnia and Herzegovina would have an automatic final berth in their next contest.

The performance featured the entire band wearing white suits and, as the final bridge began, linking arms and walking towards the front of the stage.

Charts

References

Eurovision songs of Bosnia and Herzegovina
Eurovision songs of 2006
2006 songs